Belgium competed at the 2017 World Games in Wroclaw, Poland, from July 20, 2017 to July 30, 2017.

Competitors

Gymnastic

Trampoline
Belgium has qualified at the 2017 World Games:

Women's Individual Tumbling - 1 quota

Ju-Jitsu
Belgium has qualified at the 2017 World Games:

Men's Duo - 1 quota (Bjarne Lardon & Ben Cloostermans)

Korfball
Belgium has qualified at the 2017 World Games in the Korfball Mixed Team event.

References 

Nations at the 2017 World Games
2017 in Belgian sport
2017